is a passenger railway station located in the city of  Kōka, Shiga, Japan operated by the third-sector Shigaraki Kohgen Railway.

Lines

Station layout
The station consists of one side platform serving single bi-directional track. There is no station building, and the station is unattended.

Adjacent stations

History
Gyokukeijimae Station opened on July 13, 1987.

Passenger statistics
With a ridership of 13 passengers a day, Gyokukeijimae Station has the lowest ridership on the Shigaraki Line.

Surrounding area
 Gyokukei-ji
 Koka City Shigaraki Library
 Shigaraki Gymnasium

See also
List of railway stations in Japan

References

External links

Shigaraki Railway home page

Railway stations in Japan opened in 1987
Railway stations in Shiga Prefecture
Kōka, Shiga